The Hummer H2 is a large SUV that was marketed by Hummer and built in the AM General facility under contract from General Motors from 2002 until 2009. It is based on a modified GMT820 GM three-quarter-ton pickup truck in the front and a half-ton 1500 frame in the rear. A four-door pickup truck version with a midgate that opens the vehicle's interior to the external cargo bed was introduced for the 2005 model year as the H2 SUT (sport utility truck).

Background

In 2001 and 2002, GM allowed journalists to examine early versions of the Hummer H2, which were still under development at the time.

The H2 was built by AM General under contract with General Motors at AM General Commercial Assembly Plant in Mishawaka, Indiana.

Engines
 2002–2003 Vortec 6000  LQ4 V8
-  at 5200 rpm
- 0-60 times: 10.9 sec

 2004–2007 Vortec 6000  LQ4 V8
-  at 5200 rpm
- 0-60 times: 10.7 sec
 2008–2009 Vortec 6200  L92 V8
-  at 5700 rpm
- 0-60 times: 9.1 sec

Features

Standard 
Standard features include air conditioning with tri-zone climate controls, tilt leather-wrapped steering wheel with radio controls, cruise control, leather upholstery, heated front and rear seats, 8-way power front seats, dual memory system, BOSE premium sound system, single-CD/cassette player and later in 2004, a 6-disc CD changer, then in 2008, a single CD-player with MP3 capability, an auxiliary input jack and DVD player, outside-temperature indicator, compass, rear radio controls, independent front torsion bar suspension, rear 5-link coil spring suspension specially created for the H2, oversized tires with HUMMER wheels, universal garage door opener and remote engine start (2008–2009).

Optional 
Options for the H2 include adjustable rear suspension [which is included within the Adventure Package], a wide power sunroof, rearview camera, DVD entertainment system, navigation system, ladder, custom grilles, side step bars, Air compressor with road assistance kit, and 20" chrome wheels (slightly different from stock wheels).

2008 updates
For 2008, the Hummer H2 and H2 SUT received an update. While largely unchanged on the exterior, the H2 and H2 SUT interiors were redesigned. This included a new instrument cluster with improved gauges and Driver Information Center (DIC), a new leather-wrapped steering wheel, three new radios with a Bose premium audio system and auxiliary audio inputs (including a new touchscreen GPS navigation radio with DVD audio and video playback while in the transmission is in the park position, and XM Nav-Traffic capabilities), a new rear seat DVD entertainment system, Bluetooth hands-free calling capabilities, enhanced voice activation, new OnStar hardware with buttons moved from the rearview mirror to the overhead console, a lower dashboard-mounted radio, new dual-zone climate controls, new rear seat audio system controls, a new dash-mounted control knob for the 4X4 system to replace the old pushbutton controls, brushed aluminum interior trim panels, new interior color options, available remote engine start, and a center dashboard-mounted analog clock.

Also for 2008, a new 393-horsepower, 6.2 L V8 gasoline engine replaced the old 325-horsepower, 6.0 L V8 gasoline unit, with a new "6L80-E" six-speed automatic transmission replaced the old "4L65-E" four-speed automatic unit.

Hummer launched a special 2009 Black Chrome Limited Edition featuring a new paint color, Sedona Metallic. All Black Chrome editions also had Sedona interior, black chrome accents instead of standard chrome, and unique 20-inch black chrome wheels. Initially, there were to be 1,000 to 1,300 Black Chrome editions. However, due to the mid-year production shutdown only six were ever actually made, and they were not made available to the public.

Fuel economy
General Motors was not required to provide official fuel economy ratings for the H2 due to the vehicle's heavy gross vehicle weight rating (GVWR).

Yearly American sales

References

External links
 

H2 H6
Cars introduced in 2002
Cars discontinued in 2009
Rear-wheel-drive vehicles
All-wheel-drive vehicles
Pickup trucks
Full-size sport utility vehicles
2000s cars
Motor vehicles manufactured in the United States
Sport utility trucks
Light trucks
Luxury sport utility vehicles
Off-road vehicles
Retro-style automobiles